Sun Binyong (born November 1976) is a Chinese mathematician and an academician of the Chinese Academy of Sciences (CAS).

Early life and education
Sun was born in Putuo District, Zhoushan, Zhejiang in November 1976, the second of three sons. His mother Liu Yadi is a housewife. His father Sun Kaizhu was a carpenter. He attended Shuangtang Middle School, Putuo Middle School and the High School attached to Tsinghua University. After high school, he entered Zhejiang University, where he graduated in 1999. In December 2004 he earned his doctorate degree from Hong Kong University of Science and Technology under the supervision of Li Jianshu.

Career
From January to September 2005 he was a postdoctoral researcher at the Swiss Federal Institute of Technology Zurich in Switzerland. In September 2005 he became research associate at the Institute of Mathematics and Systems Sciences, Chinese Academy of Sciences (CAS), and was promoted to researcher in 2011.

Personal life
Sun is married and has a daughter.

Honours and awards
 2014 Chen Jiageng Youth Science Award 
 June 2, 2016 Young Scientist Award of Chinese Academy of Sciences
 August 14, 2018 State Natural Science Award (Second Class)   
 November 22, 2019 Academician of the Chinese Academy of Sciences (CAS)

References

1976 births
People from Zhoushan
Living people
21st-century Chinese mathematicians
Mathematicians from Zhejiang
Zhejiang University alumni
Alumni of the Hong Kong University of Science and Technology
ETH Zurich alumni
Members of the Chinese Academy of Sciences